Latent-transforming growth factor beta-binding protein 1 is a protein that in humans is encoded by the LTBP1 gene.

The protein encoded by this gene belongs to the family of latent TGF-beta binding proteins (LTBPs). The secretion and activation of TGF-betas is regulated by their association with latency-associated proteins and with latent TGF-beta binding proteins. The product of this gene targets latent complexes of transforming growth factor beta to the extracellular matrix, where the latent cytokine is subsequently activated by several different mechanisms. Alternatively spliced transcript variants encoding different isoforms have been identified.

Interactions
LTBP1 (gene) has been shown to interact with TGF beta 1.

References

Further reading